An executioner's sword is a sword designed specifically for decapitation of condemned criminals (as opposed to combat). These swords were intended for two-handed use, but were lacking a point, so that their overall blade length was typically that of a single-handed sword (ca. ). The quillons were quite short, and mainly straight, and the pommel was often pear-shaped or faceted.

In the Middle Ages, decapitations were executed with regular swords, and the earliest known specifically designed executioner's sword dates to ca. 1540.

They were in wide use in 17th-century Europe, but fell out of use quite suddenly in the early 18th century. The last executions by sword in Europe were carried out in Switzerland in 1867 and 1868, when Niklaus Emmenegger in Lucerne and Héli Freymond in Moudon were beheaded for murder. Swords known as a sulthan are used to carry out executions in Saudi Arabia (see Capital punishment in Saudi Arabia).

The blades of executioner's swords were often decorated with symbolic designs. When no longer used for executions, an executioner's sword sometimes continued to be used as a ceremonial sword of justice, a symbol of judicial power.

See also
Guillotine
Muhammad Saad al-Beshi, Saudi Arabian executioner
Terminus Est, a fictional executioner's sword wielded by the executioner protagonist of The Book of the New Sun

External links 

German executioner's sword dated to 1674 at the Royal Armouries.

Early Modern European swords
Renaissance-era weapons